Myrmolichus is a genus of mites in the family Acaridae.

Species
 Myrmolichus greimae Türk & Türk, 1957

References

Acaridae